The 2022–23 Oklahoma Sooners men's basketball team represented the University of Oklahoma during the 2022–23 NCAA Division I men's basketball season. The team was led by head coach Porter Moser in his second year and played their home games at Lloyd Noble Center in Norman, Oklahoma, as members of the Big 12 Conference.

Previous season
The Sooners finished the 2021–22 season 19–16, 7–11 in Big 12 Play to finish in eighth place. They defeated Baylor in the quarterfinals of the Big 12 tournament before losing in the semifinals to Texas Tech. They were one of the last four teams not selected for the NCAA tournament. When no team withdrew from the NCAA Tournament, they received an at-large bid to the National Invitation Tournament where they defeated Missouri State before losing to St. Bonaventure.

Offseason

Departures

Incoming transfers

2022 recruiting class

Roster

Schedule and results

|-
!colspan=9 style=|Exhibition

|-
!colspan=9 style=|Regular season

|-
!colspan=9 style=|Big 12 tournament

References

Oklahoma
Oklahoma Sooners men's basketball seasons